FC Dynamo Brest (FK Dynama Brest) is a Belarusian professional football club based in Brest. The club plays in the Belarusian Premier League, the top division in Belarusian football.

In 2019, Dynamo won its first Belarusian Premier League title. The club has also won the Belarusian Cup in 2007, 2017 and 2018.

History

Origins
The club was founded in 1960 as Spartak Brest and joined Soviet Class B (second-tier league) the same year. After the 1962 season, they were relegated as a result of league reorganization. They came close to promotion twice in 1964 and 1967 but lost the final round both times. They were finally promoted on their third attempt in 1969, but the following year they again dropped to the third tier due to league reorganization. In 1972, the team was renamed to Bug Brest and finally, in 1976 to Dуnamo Brest. From 1970 until the end of the Soviet era, the club was playing in the Soviet third-tier league. Dynamo Brest had a strong connection with Dinamo Minsk during these years (as both clubs were affiliated to Dinamo Sports Society) and often accepted young Minsk team players on loan.

Belarusian Premier League
In 1992, Dynamo Brest joined the Belarusian Premier League and have been playing there ever since. Their best result was a title in 2019 season, with 5 points of difference to BATE Borisov. In 2007, Dynamo Brest won the Belarusian Cup, also securing their only UEFA Cup participation. During the 2012 season, they were using the name FC Brest due to legal issues with using a Dynamo brand name the rights to which were claimed by Belarusian Dynamo Sport Society. This issue was resolved only by the end of the year. In the 2017 season, Dinamo Brest drew an average home league attendance of 5,689, the highest in the league.

Name changes
1960: founded as Spartak Brest
1972: renamed to Bug Brest (after Bug River)
1976: renamed to Dinamo Brest
2012: renamed to FC Brest
2013: renamed back to Dinamo Brest (in 2017, Latin spelling altered to Dynamo, as seen on the updated logo)

Supporters and rivalries

The first organised fan group was created on 1 August 1998, and the fan-dedicated stand can hold around 200–500 fans. An ultras group was created in 2008. The fans call themselves the Blue White Devils. They are politically right-wing.

The club have two fan-clubs: in Pinsk and Kobrin. The one official friendship, with fans of Orlęta Radzyń Podlaski, and good contacts with fans Dinamo Minsk and BATE Borisov. Their rivals are all left-wing fans, FC Gomel, Dnepr Mogilev, Shakhtyor Soligorsk, Slavia Mozyr, Belshina Bobruisk, Torpedo Minsk and Neman Grodno.

Honours
 Belarusian Premier League
 Winners (1): 2019
 Third place (1): 1992
 Belarusian Cup
 Winners (3): 2006–07, 2016–17, 2017–18
 Runners-up (1): 2019–20
 Belarusian Super Cup
 Winners (3): 2018, 2019, 2020

Current squad
As of March 2023

League and Cup history

Soviet Union

 1 Relegated as the 2nd level (Class B) was reduced from 10 zones (150 teams) in 1962 to a single group of 18 teams in 1963.
 2 Advanced to the final round as the best-placed team from Belarusian SSR. No team won the promotion from this final group in the end.
 3 Advanced to the semi-final round of promotion tournament (for one spot) as one of top 8 teams not from Russian, Ukrainian, Kazakh or Central Asian SSR.
 4 As the best-placed team from Belarusian SSR, Spartak advanced to promotion/relegation play-off against the lowest-placed Belarusian team from the 2nd level.
 5 Relegated as the 2nd level (Class B Second Group, renamed to Class B First Group from next season) was reduced from 4 zones (87 teams) in 1969 to a single group of 22 teams in 1970.
 6 In 1973, every draw was followed by a penalty shoot-out, with a winner gaining 1-point and loser gaining 0.

Belarus

European record

Managers

 Eduard Malofeyev (1977–1978)
 Ivan Shchekin (1 Jan 1985 – 31 December 1986)
 Liudas Rumbutis (1 Jan 1987 – 31 December 1990)
 Yuri Kurnenin (1 Jan 1991 – 31 December 1992)
 Vladimir Gevorkyan (1 Jan 1994 – 1 January 1997)
 Viktor Sokol (2001)
 Andrei Sosnitskiy (1 Jan 2002 – 1 January 2003)
 Vladimir Gevorkyan (1 July 2003 – 30 December 2003)
 Viktors Ņesterenko (9 Jan 2004 – 31 May 2004)
 Vladimir Kurnev (1 June 2004 – 30 November 2004)
 Mikhail Markhel (1 Jan 2005 – 5 December 2005)
 Sergei Borovsky (6 Dec 2005 – 31 December 2006)
 Vladimir Gevorkyan (1 Jan 2007 – 28 April 2008)
 Vyacheslav Arushanov (interim) (29 April 2008 – 11 June 2008)
 Evgeni Trotsyuk (12 June 2008 – 5 August 2009)
 Sergey Kovalchuk (interim) (6 Aug 2009 – 15 September 2009)
 Yury Puntus (16 September 2009 – 12 July 2011)
 Sergey Kovalchuk (13 July 2011 – 8 July 2012)
 Vladimir Kurnev (9 July 2012 – 20 September 2013)
 Andrey Prokopyuk (interim) (21 September 2013 – 24 September 2013)
 Sergey Kovalchuk (25 September 2013 – 4 December 2016)
 Uladzimir Zhuravel (4 Dec 2016 – Dec 2017)
 Radoslav Látal (Jan 2018 – May 2018)
 Sergey Kovalchuk (May 2018 – June 2018)
 Aleksey Shpilevsky (June 2018 – August 2018)
 Marcel Lička (August 2018 – December 2019)
 Sergey Kovalchuk (January 2020 – )

References

External links
Home page 
Dynamo Brest at UEFA.COM
Dynamo Brest at EUFO.DE
Dynamo Brest at Weltfussball.de
Dynamo Brest at Football-Lineups.com

 
Football clubs in Belarus
Football clubs in Brest, Belarus
Brest
Association football clubs established in 1960
1960 establishments in Belarus